Morta may refer to:
 Morta of Lithuania, Queen of Lithuania (1253–1262)
 Morta (mythology), the goddess of death in Roman mythology
 Morta (wood), a semi-fossilized wood
 Morta, a hamlet in Prunelli-di-Fiumorbo, Corsica, France
 Piotr Paweł Morta (born 1959), Polish political activist
 A character in the Star Trek episode "Rascals"
 A byproduct of ghee used as a spread in Egyptian cuisine

See also
 Mão Morta, a Portuguese avant-garde rock band
 Mortha
 Mortar (disambiguation)